Dissotis rotundifolia, commonly called pink lady, Spanish Shawl, or rockrose, is a shrub in the family Melastomataceae that occurs in tropical Africa.

Description

Dissotis rotundifolia can grow in a variety of ways, from straight up and erect to lying flat and prostrate to decumbent, meaning the branches lie flat on the ground but turn up at the ends. When the stems trail, they root where the leaf connects to the stem, called the "node". The stems are woody on lower parts of the plant and become hirsute, meaning hairy, towards the top of the plant. The branches tend to spread wide, and range from pink to a dark reddish in color.

They are covered with short, appressed hairs on both sides.

The flowers of Dissotis rotundifolia are solitary, and the stalks of the flowers, like the leaves, are covered with tiny appressed hairs.

Habitat and ecology

Dissotis rotundifolia is native to Africa, occurring naturally in central and western Africa from Sierra Leone to Zaire. It has been introduced as a ground cover and ornamental plant to other tropical areas such as Puerto Rico, Hawaii, Malaysia, and the West Indies, and has become naturalised in some topical parts of Australia.

Uses

The leaves of Dissotis rotundifolia are used as a spice for sauces and as a potherb. In Liberia, the plant is used as a diuretic.

References

Melastomataceae
Shrubs